Hattenheim is a Stadtteil in Eltville am Rhein, Hesse, Germany.  It lies within the Rheingau wine region.

Points of interest 
 Burg Hattenheim
 Eberbach Abbey (Kloster Eberbach)
 Schloss Reichartshausen
 Steinberg, Kloster Eberbach

References

External links 
 
 Hattenheim Official site 

Villages in Hesse
Rheingau-Taunus-Kreis
Rheingau